The Old Port of Montreal–Longueuil Ferry is a Summer ferry service operating on the Saint Lawrence River between Montreal and Longueuil, Quebec, Canada. It carries pedestrians and cyclists from the Réal Bouvier Marina in Longueuil to Saint Helen's Island and the Jacques-Cartier Pier Old Port of Montreal.

It operates from late-May until early-October, with hourly departures during regular business hours seven days a week from late-June to early-September.

They have a capacity of 196 passengers, or 150 passengers and 70 bicycles.

Both ends of the ferry crossing are linked to Quebec's Route Verte bicycle trail network.

References

External links
Navette Maritimes du Saint-Laurent

Ferries of Quebec
Transport in Longueuil
Transport in Montreal
Old Montreal
Parc Jean-Drapeau